Michael Boyce (born 1980 in Perth, Western Australia) is a field hockey player from Australia, who was a member of the team that won the silver medal at the 2006 World Hockey Cup.

School
At school level Michael represented the Scotch College in the Public Schools Associations, 'Ray House Hockey Cup' competition. He was selected to represent the PSA Combined XI against the HOTSPURS in 1997. He was a member of the Ray House Hockey Cup winning teams in 1995 & 1997.

Club
At club level Michael plays for The University of Western Australia Hockey Club (UWAHC), where he was selected at Right Halfback in the Legends Team at the club's 80th anniversary in 2004. He has represented the Club more than 250 times at 1st Grade level, and played in Premiership teams in 2002, 2004, 2005 & 2007. Michael became the club president in 2014.

National
Michael has represented Western Australia at underage and open level, having played for the SmokeFree WA Thundersticks 1999–2007, including National titles in 1999, 2000 & 2002.

International
Michael has represented Australia (Kookaburras) at senior and Junior (Under 21) level. He has played a total of 51 matches and scored 8 goals.

Including:
2006 Hockey World Cup Silver Medal
2006 Champions Trophy 4th
2001 Junior Hockey World Cup 5th

Greatest Achievement
Michael's greatest achievement has been serving as patron of "Team Boyce", a standout UWA men's hockey team, premiers in 2011 and 2014.

Family Ties

Father is Craig Boyce who has represented the Kookaburras.
Mother is Janis Boyce

Brother is Geoff Boyce who has represented the Kookaburras.
Brother is Steven Boyce, Australian Development squad 2005.
Sister is Fiona Boyce, SmokeFree WA Diamonds Squad.
Uncle is Grant Boyce has represented Kookaburras, including 1984 Olympic Games.
Aunt is Adele Boyce has represented Hockeyroos.
Cousin is Matthew Boyce.

External links
 
 https://web.archive.org/web/20070307114712/http://www.hockeywa.org.au/thunderstruck/thundersticks.cfm
 https://web.archive.org/web/20170218124254/http://www.hockey.sport.uwa.edu.au/

People educated at Scotch College, Perth
Australian male field hockey players
Male field hockey defenders
Living people
1980 births
Field hockey players from Perth, Western Australia
2006 Men's Hockey World Cup players